Capperia bonneaui is a moth of the family Pterophoridae. It is found in Spain.

References

Moths described in 1987
Oxyptilini